Vysoká Lhota is a municipality and village in Pelhřimov District in the Vysočina Region of the Czech Republic. As of 2022, it has 16 inhabitants and it is the least populated municipality of the country. With an average age of 64.1, it is also the municipality with the oldest population.

References

Villages in Pelhřimov District